Learning health systems (LHS) are health and healthcare systems in which knowledge generation processes are embedded in daily practice to improve individual and population health. At its most fundamental level, a learning health system applies a conceptual approach wherein science, informatics, incentives, and culture are aligned to support continuous improvement, innovation, and equity, and seamlessly embed knowledge and best practices into care delivery

The idea was first conceptualized in a 2006 workshop organized by the US Institute of Medicine (now the National Academy of Medicine (NAM)), building on ideas around evidence-based medicine and "practice-based evidence". and around recognition of the persistent gap between evidence generated in the context of biomedical research and the application of that evidence in the provision of care. The need to close this gap was further underscored by the growth of electronic health records (EHR) and other innovations in health information technology and computational power, and the resulting ability to generate data that can lead to better evidence and better outcomes. There has since been increasing interest in the topic, including the creation of the Wiley journal Learning Health Systems.

Cornerstone elements of the LHS include:
generation, application, and improvement of scientific knowledge;
an organizational infrastructure that supports the engagement of communities of patients, healthcare professionals and researchers who collaborate to identify evidence gaps that could be addressed through research in routine healthcare settings;
deployment of computational technologies and informatics approaches that organize and leverage large electronic health data sets, i.e. "big data" for use in research;
quality improvement at the point of care for each patient using new knowledge generated by research.

Other compatible ways of describing the LHS co-exist alongside the NAM definition, including the definition used by AHRQ, the Agency for Healthcare Research and Quality. AHRQ defines a learning health system as "a health system in which internal data and experience are systematically integrated with external evidence, and that knowledge is put into practice. As a result, patients get higher quality, safer, more efficient care, and health care delivery organizations become better places to work.”

History 
The NAM’s early efforts to develop the ideas underpinning the LHS began in 2006, via a series of workshops held over several years from 2006-2013. Among several early publications to express the need for a rapid learning health system was a commentary in Health Affairs in 2007 where Lynn Etheredge applied the term “rapid learning health system” in recognition of the opportunity to leverage electronic health records (EHR) to “learn” what works in health care. The series of NAM workshops generated several summary publications on topics under the mantle of the LHS, including publications focused on the digital infrastructure as well as on ethical considerations. In 2013, the workshops culminated in a seminal report, “Best Care at Lower Cost: the Path to Continuously Learning Health Care in America.” Summarizing the heretofore efforts, McGinnis and colleagues enumerate key milestones in the evolution of the LHS that include these reports as well as decades-old efforts to generate evidence from routine health care delivery.

Nomenclature may vary in reference to the LHS concept. Some refer to a learning healthcare system, others refer to learning health systems or collaborative learning health networks. The architecture and objectives are similar, irrespective of the label—addressing evidence gaps, harnessing data, and effectively utilizing the best evidence at the point of need. Related concepts include the use of real-world data to generate real-world evidence, and mobilizing computable biomedical knowledge.

Given that the LHS has an expansive definition and scope, many of the early adopters of this approach were health systems that also had embedded research capabilities, such as a formal department or institute. The Veterans Administration Health System, Group Health Cooperative, Kaiser Permanente  and Geisinger Health System  were among the vanguard organizations who also published insights from their experience of launching formal learning health system activities. Increasingly, academic health systems have taken up the principles and practices espoused by the earliest adopters.

Adoption and spread 
Early experiences with deploying the LHS have been instructive and have led to further adoption and spread. The LHS model is being applied in specific medical specialties such as pediatrics  and oncology, and further examination of the environment and conditions that support learning have spurred development of increasingly  detailed and specialized frameworks  that can support further adoption and adaptation based on the needs, features, and capabilities of a particular health system.

Along with a growing body of peer-reviewed publications on the specific experience of different systems as they evolve toward continuous learning, review articles have been published to reflect on the growth of the LHS as a whole. A systematic review by Budrionis  observed that the ability to evaluate how well an LHS improves outcomes was not well-explored in the literature. Subsequently, Platt  examined progress of theories and implementation of the LHS, Nash focused a review on deployment of the LHS in primary care, and Ellis mapped empirical applications of the LHS. Easterling and colleagues (REF LHS 2022) proffer an elaborate taxonomy of LHS elements and use this to describe an LHS-IP, or “Learning Health System In Practice” as a model for health care systems who seek to become an LHS.

The motivations for applying LHS concepts are largely and logically focused on improving the quality of care. Exemplar organizations are numerous and growing and include both community-based health systems and university-based academic health systems/medical centers in the United States:
 
 Atrium Health/Advocate Aurora
 Baylor Scott & White Health
 Care South Carolina
 Cleveland Clinic
 Children’s Hospital of Philadelphia
 Cincinnati Children's Hospital Medical Center
 Denver Health Medical Center
 Geisinger Health System
 HealthPartners
 Indiana University Health | Regenstrief Institute
 Kaiser Permanente
 Mayo Clinic
 Medstar Health
 Feinberg School of Medicine
 NYU Langone Health
 SSM Health
 Sutter Health
 Trillium Healthcare Institute for Better Health (Canada)
 University of Alabama at Birmingham School of Medicine
 Michigan Medicine
 UPMC
 Vanderbilt University Medical Center
 Veterans Administration Health System
 Wake Forest School of Medicine
 Washington University in St. Louis School of Medicine
 Weill-Cornell

In many cases, these institutions are engaged in research activities such as the HCSRN, Clinical and Translational Science Awards (CTSA), and PCORnet where the LHS concepts are applied. The University of Michigan has also established a formal academic department, the Department of Learning Health Sciences. Alongside these exemplar organizations, related initiatives and consortia have been established in recent years. The Learning Health Community is an umbrella organization that has united many systems and health data organizations to develop shared principles and processes, and foster learning about the applications of technologies in the context of learning systems via a periodic virtual forum (LHS IT Forum). Given their centrality to the generation of health data and information, two of the largest EHR vendors have also created communities to support LHS: Cerner’s Learning Health Network and Epic System's Health Research Network (LINK). Still, much of the LHS development has been concentrated in large academic medical centers and health systems with a sizable footprint. Masica notes that nearly 85% of more than 6000 hospitals in the US are categorized as community hospitals, and the ability to develop and implement an LHS may be more challenging due to workforce and other constraints.

Dissemination of the activities and experiences of learning health systems has been an instrumental aspect of their growth and spread.  While peer-reviewed literature on the LHS appears in a variety of journals, the creation of Healthcare: the Journal of Delivery Science and Innovation and the Learning Health Systems Journal are dedicated to manuscripts that showcase the experience of those deploying or refining aspects of learning in real-world practices. Each has also published special issues with thematic emphases on LHS-related topics such as embedded research and ethical, legal, and social implications of the LHS. Another marker of the spread of the LHS is its international adoption. Australia, Canada, the United Kingdom and other countries are applying the LHS concepts, offering opportunities to compare and contrast global experiences and develop a richer picture of how the local context, structure of care delivery, and regulatory environment affect the ability to support continuous learning. Patient involvement in the LHS has grown, partly due to the establishment of the Patient-Centered Outcomes Research Institute, continued emphasis on shared decision-making, and the growing recognition of participatory medicine. However, the engagement of patients is not consistent across health systems and there is not a uniform template for patient engagement or approaches to educating patients about the value and significance of the LHS as a model for improving evidence-based care.

Electronic health data 
A large proportion of LHS research relies on the use of electronic health records (EHRs) and must navigate the inherent challenges of EHRs. EHRs were primarily created to support billing for clinical services and tracking health insurance claims. Generation of rich real-world clinical data is an essential "byproduct" of this highly transactional purpose of the contemporary EHR.

LHS leverages a clinical lifecycle. Patient data is collected, which can then be amalgamated across multiple patients to define and analyze a problem. These are activities largely driven by healthcare professionals. With the support of technology (both computational and statistical), an analysis of the amalgamated data returns evidence, from which knowledge is generated. Ideally, this can lead to changes in clinical practice, and thus to new patient data being collected. Dissemination of implementation of new evidence can be operationally and technically challenging in many settings, including the original health system that identified a problem based on their own clinical data.

McLachlan and colleagues (2018) suggest a taxonomy of nine LHS classification types:
Cohort identification looks for patients with similar attributes.
Positive deviance finds examples of better care against a benchmark.
Negative deviance finds examples of sub-optimal care.
Predictive patient risk modeling uses patterns in data to find groups at greater risk of adverse events.
Predictive care risk and outcome models identify situations that are at greater risk of poor care.
Clinical decision support systems use patient algorithms applied to patient data to make specific treatment recommendations.
Comparative effectiveness research determines the most effective treatments.
Intelligent assistance use data to automate routine processes.
Surveillance monitors data for disease outbreaks or other treatment issues.

Synergy with other disciplines 
The LHS is a multidisciplinary and multi-stakeholder model for improvement, wherein clinical practitioners, health system leaders, data analysts and health IT experts, operations personnel, and researchers bring requisite expertise to bear throughout the cycle of improving health and healthcare. In a complex healthcare environment, engagement of all health system stakeholders is necessary to successfully identify and prioritize evidence gaps, develop suitable interventions, analyze insights from the interventions, and deploy resulting changes. Hence, many disciplines and scientific domains may contribute various types of subspecialty expertise including:
 
 Health Informatics
 Clinical Trials
 Data Science and Machine Learning
 Organizational Psychology
 Quality Improvement
 Implementation Research

Training 
As the LHS has matured, leaders and vanguard organizations have identified the requisite skills needed to lead and develop interventions that support learning. The Agency for Healthcare Research and Quality convened a technical expert panel in 2016 to identify core competencies, which yielded 33 competencies spanning seven domains. These competency domains are (1) Systems Science; (2) Research Questions and Standards of Scientific Evidence; (3) Research Methods; (4) Informatics; (5) Ethics of Research and Implementation in Health Systems; (6) Improvement and Implementation Science; (7) Engagement, Leadership, and Research Management. An 8th domain, Equity and Justice, was added in 2022 and a total of 38 competencies are now identified. These competencies form the backbone of a training program collaboratively funded by AHRQ and PCORI, two US funding agencies that also issue funding opportunities for LHS-related studies. A $40 million funding opportunity for mentored career development awards was issued in 2017 and 11 Centers of Excellence were awarded five years of federal funding in 2018 to support the training of clinician and research scientists to conduct patient-centered outcomes research within LHS.

The LHS Centers of Excellence are:
A Chicago Center of Excellence in Learning Health Systems Research Training (ACCELERAT), Northwestern University, Chicago, Ill.
CATALyST: Consortium for Applied Training to Advance the Learning Health System with Scholars/Trainees, Kaiser Permanente Washington Research Institute, Seattle, WA.
Learning Health System Scholar Program at Vanderbilt, Vanderbilt University, Nashville, Tenn.
Leveraging Infrastructure to Train Investigators in Patient-Centered Outcomes Research in Learning Health System (LITI- PCORLHS), Indiana University School of Medicine, Indianapolis, Ind.
Minnesota Learning Health System Mentored Career Development Program (MN-LHS), University of Minnesota, Minneapolis, Minnesota.
Northwest Center of Excellence & K12 in Patient Centered Learning Health Systems Science, Oregon Health and Science University, Portland, Oregon.
PEDSnet Scholars: A Training Program for Pediatric Learning Health System Researchers, Children’s Hospital of Philadelphia, Philadelphia, PA
Stakeholder-Partnered Implementation Research and Innovation Translation (SPIRIT) program, University of California Los Angeles, Los Angeles, California.
The Center of Excellence in Promoting LHS Operations and Research at Einstein/Montefiore (EXPLORE), Albert Einstein College of Medicine, Bronx, N.Y.
Transforming the Generation and Adoption of PCOR into Practice (T-GAPP), University of Pennsylvania, Philadelphia, PA.
University of California-San Francisco Learning Health System K12 Career Development Program, University of California San Francisco, San Francisco, California.

Other similar training and fellowship programs have been offered by AcademyHealth via their Delivery System Science Fellowship program, Kaiser Permanente’s Division of Research, and the Veterans Administration via the Seattle-Denver Center of Innovation. Program offerings and emphases vary from institution to institution, but all involve training and professional development in topics related to improving health systems and the ability to generate and learn from evidence. Articles describing multidisciplinary workforce training efforts was published as a supplement to the LHS Journal in 2022

Funding and financial support 
Support for learning activities may be derived from federal, philanthropic, and other sources. Examples include the National Institutes of Health and AHRQ (federal); and the Robert Wood Johnson Foundation (philanthropic). The Patient-Centered Outcomes Research Institute (PCORI) has designated the realization of a national learning health system as one of their five national priorities for health, which is indicative of future funding opportunities. Funding provided to personnel within an organization (i.e., a health system) may be designated for internally-directed learning activities with no expectation about developing and publishing generalizable results. In this way, learning health system may be distinguished from traditional health services or informatics research and more closely resemble the funding and infrastructure that health systems designate for quality improvement activities. In 2015, the Centers for Medicare and Medicaid Services (CMS) funded the Health Care Payment Learning and Action Network to ascertain what works with respect to alternative health care delivery arrangements, however, reimbursement for learning activities from insurers/payers is not currently a steady avenue for financial support to incentivize health system learning.

Ethical considerations 
Bioethics scholars including Faden, Asch, Finkelstein, Morain, and Platt have averred that in a learning health system, consideration should be given to both clinical ethics and research ethics. Faden, Kass and colleagues have put forth an ethics framework for the learning health system that is anchored on seven essential obligations: (1) respecting dignity and rights of all patients; (2) respecting clinical judgment; (3) providing optimal care to every patient; (4) avoiding the introduction of non-clinical burdens and risks; (5) reducing health inequities; (6) ensuring responsible activities are conducted in a way that fosters learning; and (7) contributing to the overall aim of improving quality and value in health care. This framework and several companion articles were published as a special report from the Hastings Center. Subsequent articles by Finkelstein et al, as well as Asch and colleagues seek to use examples of learning activities as a means to describe different approaches to research oversight and compliance. Rigorous deliberations about the approach to informed consent are also germane to the ethics of learning activities in the healthcare context.

See also 
 Real World Evidence

References 

Health informatics
Decision support systems